Cyrtodactylus phetchaburiensis is a species of gecko that is endemic to Thailand.

References 

Cyrtodactylus
Reptiles described in 2016